Aston Martin Racing is a British auto racing team established in 2004 as a partnership between automobile manufacturer Aston Martin and engineering group Prodrive.  The partnership was initially created for the purpose of returning Aston Martin to sports car racing with the DBR9, a heavily modified variant of the Aston Martin DB9.  Since the DBR9's racing debut in 2005, Aston Martin Racing has expanded to build a variety of cars available to customers, as well as development of Aston Martin's V12 engine for Le Mans Prototype use.  Aston Martin Racing's program has earned several successes over the years.

Although all cars are built by Prodrive at their factory, Aston Martin plays an integral part in designing the race cars, as well as integrating elements of the race cars back into Aston Martin's road cars.

Aston Martin had previously raced in the 1959 and 1960 Formula One seasons but failed to score points in either year.

Cars
Aston Martin Racing built cars for international grand tourer classes.  The team itself ran a squad of DBR9s in the former top class, GT1, while other cars were offered to customers. The GTE class (formerly GT2) became their next target after the failure of the 2011 season, and the car is based on the V8 Vantage. The V8 Vantage also featured in GT3 and GT4 classes. Before the GT3 Vantage was introduced the DBRS9 solely raced in GT3.

In 2008, Aston Martin Racing entered into the Le Mans Prototype category with the aid of Charouz Racing System, installing a DBR9 V12 into a Lola B08/60 LMP1 prototype.

On 27 January 2009, the team announced a full works entry in the Le Mans Prototype category for the 2009 24 Hours of Le Mans with the Lola-Aston Martin B09/60. The entry marks the 50th anniversary of its last outright win at Le Mans. The 2009 programme got off to an unfortunate start at the pre season Paul Ricard test on 8 March when Tomáš Enge destroyed the 007 car in an accident. Aston Martin Racing subsequently took delivery of a new Lola to replace the written off chassis. The team entered two LMP1 cars bearing the iconic blue and orange livery of Gulf Oil. The aim was to emulate the achievements of the 1959 race win with the DBR1 driven by Carroll Shelby and Roy Salvadori. At Le Mans the AMR Eastern Europe 007 car of Jan Charouz, Tomáš Enge and Stefan Mücke finished fourth behind the factory entries of Peugeot and Audi, as well as being the highest finishing petrol-fuelled car. The 008 car was running as high as 3rd overall in the morning until Anthony Davidson had a collision with a GT1 Aston. Subsequent repairs and a 5-minute stop and go penalty—for causing the collision—dropped the car out of contention. The 009 car was retired after 252 laps.

Three cars were also entered in the 2010 24 Hours of Le Mans, although only the 007 and 009 cars were run by Aston Martin Racing; the 008 car was run by the French team Signature-Plus. Both the 008 and 009 cars suffered from problems and had to be retired, leaving only the 007 to finish 6th overall and completing 365 laps, less than it did in 2009.

In 2011 the B09/60 was succeeded by the Aston Martin AMR-One, powered by a downsized, 2.0 litre turbocharged straight six petrol engine. Initially, the car was running very poorly. In its first racing event, the 2011 6 Hours of Castellet, it was only as fast as some of the LMP2 cars in qualifying and was plagued with mechanical issues. It completed only 96 laps. They then decided not to race it in the rounds of the Intercontinental Le Mans Cup leading up to Le Mans so they can continue private testing with the troubled car in order to sort out the mechanical issues. So around came Le Mans and despite the testing and extra car, they were still lapping in the middle of the LMP2 pack in qualifying and in the race it was much a much worse scenario. Car #009 retired after only two laps around the Circuit de la Sarthe and car #007 retired two laps later on lap four. Both cars completed a combined six laps at the 79th Grand Prix of Endurance. After this shocking result, the team raced the old B09/60 for the remainder of the season although a much downgraded version in order to comply with the new 2011 regulations.

For 2012, Aston Martin Racing returned to GT racing with the V8 Vantage GT2. They entered two cars at the 2012 24 Hours of Le Mans with one in the LMGTE-Pro class and one in the LMGTE-Am class. They also had a third Vantage in the GTE-Pro class as a reserve entrant. One of the existing AMR-One's has been sold to Pescarolo Sport who are set to compete with that car and naming it the Pescarolo 03. They will use an engine from Judd Power rather than the Aston Martin powerplant. The other AMR-One has formed the base for the new DeltaWing project which debuted at Le Mans in 2012 with Highcroft Racing. The DeltaWing uses the AMR-One's carbon fibre tub.

In 2013 to celebrate the centenary of the marque, the team will be entering two 2013 specification Aston Martin Vantage GTE's in the LMGTE PRO class and two 2012 specification Vantage GTE's in LMGTE AM. The team will also compete in the full season of the FIA World Endurance Championship with the same cars. Ex-Formula 1 driver Bruno Senna will join the team for the season in the one of the GTE Pro cars partnered by Frédéric Makowiecki and Robert Bell. The main GTE Pro car will feature AMR regulars  Darren Turner and Stefan Mücke and will be joined by Peter Dumbreck for the 24 hours of Le Mans and the Six hours of Spa-Franchorchamps.

On 21 November 2017 Aston Martin revealed the new Vantage: a dynamic successor to the biggest-selling road car in the British marque's history. This evening, in an unprecedented synchronised launch, Aston Martin Racing revealed the new 2018 Vantage GTE: the spectacular new FIA World Endurance Championship challenger poised to replace the team's most successful competition car of all-time, the multiple Le Mans-winning V8 Vantage GTE.
Aston Martin Racing has confirmed it will race two brand new Vantage GTEs in the GTE Pro category of the 2018/19 FIA World Endurance Championship (WEC) Super Season.

On 21 January 2021, Aston Martin Racing announced their decision to end their World Endurance Championship LMGTE Pro career and their Vantage GTE factory program in order to focus on their Formula One effort, as well as their LMGTE Am program.

Factory drivers

Current

Results
Since the team's debut at the 2005 12 Hours of Sebring, Aston Martin Racing has earned several important victories in their career.  Their very first race actually earned them their first victory, defeating the Corvette Racing squad at Sebring.  The RAC Tourist Trophy was also won later that year.

For 2006, Aston Martin Racing entered the full American Le Mans Series season, earning five victories including the Petit Le Mans, and finishing second in the GT1 championship, three points shy of Corvette Racing.

For 2009 Aston Martin Racing entered two of their new prototypes along with Aston Martin Racing Eastern Europe which completed the works trio of DBR1-2 or Lola-Aston Martin B09/60. The team's greatest success with the new prototype came with the 2009 Le Mans Series (LMS) where in the first round in Barcelona the team won the 1000 km de Catalunya outright and with a string of podiums and a 1-2-3 sweep of the ADAC 1000 km Nürburgring and a podium at the Autosport 1000 km of Silverstone sealed the 2009 drivers title for 007 and Jan Charouz, Tomáš Enge, Stefan Mucke and the constructors title for Aston Martin-LOLA as well as the team title for Aston Martin Racing.

Since 2012 Aston Martin Racing has been racing in the FIA World Endurance Championship with the Aston Martin Vantage GTE, earning them several wins and titles. During the inaugural season of the FIA World Endurance Championship in 2012 Aston Martin Racing finished runner-up in the LMGTE Pro Trophy. In 2014 they won the FIA Endurance Trophy for LMGTE Am Teams and Drivers with Danish duo Kristian Poulsen and David Heinemeier Hansson. During the season they also won the 2014 24 Hours of Le Mans in the LMGTE Am category. In 2016 Aston Martin Racing managed to take the crown in the World Endurance Cup for GT Drivers with Nicki Thiim and Marco Sørensen. They also won the LMGTE Pro Teams’ championship. The 2017 season saw them win both the Drivers’ and Teams’ Championship in the GTE Am category. In June 2017 Aston Martin Racing also won the 2017 24 Hours of Le Mans in GTE Pro with Darren Turner, Jonathan Adam and Daniel Serra driving the winning Aston Martin Vantage GTE.

24 Hours of Le Mans results

References

External links

 

Racing
2004 establishments in the United Kingdom
24 Hours of Le Mans teams
American Le Mans Series teams
Auto racing teams established in 2004
Blancpain Endurance Series teams
British auto racing teams
British GT Championship teams
European Le Mans Series teams
FIA GT Championship teams
FIA World Endurance Championship teams
WeatherTech SportsCar Championship teams
Super GT teams
FIA GT1 World Championship teams
British racecar constructors